Oleoresins are semi-solid extracts composed of resin and essential or fatty oil, obtained by evaporation of the solvents used for their production. The oleoresin of conifers is known as crude turpentine or gum turpentine, which consists of oil of turpentine and rosin.

Properties 
In contrast to essential oils obtained by steam distillation, oleoresins abound in heavier, less volatile and lipophilic compounds, such as resins, waxes, fats and fatty oils. Gummo-oleoresins (oleo-gum resins, gum resins) occur mostly as crude balsams and contain also water-soluble gums. Processing of oleoresins is conducted on a large scale, especially in China (400,000 tons per year in the 1990s), but the technology is too labor-intensive to be viable in countries with high labor costs, such as the US.

Oleoresins are prepared from spices, such as basil, capsicum (paprika), cardamom, celery seed, cinnamon bark, clove bud, fenugreek, fir balsam, ginger, jambu, labdanum, mace, marjoram, nutmeg, parsley, pepper (black/white), pimenta (allspice), rosemary, sage, savory (summer/winter), thyme, turmeric, vanilla, and West Indian bay leaves. The solvents used are nonaqueous and may be polar (alcohols) or nonpolar (hydrocarbons, carbon dioxide).

Oleoresins are similar to perfumery concretes, obtained especially from flowers, and to perfumery resinoids, which are prepared also from animal secretions.

Use 
Most oleoresins are used as flavors and perfumes, some are used medicinally (e. g., oleoresin of dry Cannabis infructescence). Oleoresin capsicum is commonly used as a basis for tear gases. There are also uses known in the manufacture of soaps of cosmetics, as well as coloring agents for foods.

References 

 
Flavors
Resins